Trephopoda is a genus of southern African ground spiders first described by R. W. E. Tucker in 1923. They have only been found in Namibia and South Africa.

Species
 it contains six species:
T. aplanita (Tucker, 1923) – South Africa
T. biamenta (Tucker, 1923) – South Africa
T. ctenipalpis (Lawrence, 1927) – Namibia
T. hanoveria Tucker, 1923 – South Africa
T. kannemeyeri (Tucker, 1923) – South Africa
T. parvipalpa (Tucker, 1923) – South Africa

Formerly included:
T. lineatipes (Purcell, 1908) (Transferred to Smionia)

See also
 List of Gnaphosidae species

References

Further reading

Gnaphosidae genera
Spiders of South Africa
Arthropods of Namibia